Monte Prelà is a mountain in Liguria, northern Italy, part of the Ligurian Apennines.

Geography 
The mountain is located in the comune of Torriglia, province of Genoa, south of Monte Antola.

The sources of the Trebbia and Scrivia rivers, right affluents of the Po, are located at Monte Prelà.

Conservation 
The mountain since 1989 is included in the Parco naturale regionale dell'Antola.

References 

Prela
Prela
Prela